De Verwachting is a smock mill in Hollum, Friesland, Netherlands which was built in 1991 and is in working order.

History

A mill previously stood on this site. It was built in 1840 by millwright Van der Meer of Harlingen for Hendrik Willems de Boer. A few years before the Second World War, a diesel engine was installed, but the mill was worked by wind during the war as no diesel fuel was available to run the engine. The mill was demolished in 1949. In 1991, a windmill was moved from Brucht, Overijssel. It was built on the site of the original mill by millwrights Fabrikaat Hiemstra of Tzummarum at a cost of ƒ679,920. The mill was officially opened on 16 November 1994.

Description

De Verwachting is what the Dutch describe as a "stellingmolen" . It is a two-storey smock mill on a three-storey base. The smock and cap are thatched. The mill is winded by tailpole and winch. The sails are Common sails. The sails are carried on a cast-iron windshaft, which was cast by Fabrikaat Buurma, Oudeschans, Groningen in 1991. The windshaft also carries the clasp arm brake wheel, which has 55 cogs. This drives the wallower (27 cogs) at the top of the upright shaft. At the bottom of the upright shaft, the great spur wheel, which has 77 cogs, it drives the  diameter Cullen millstones via a lantern pinion stone nut which has 26 staves.

Public access

De Verwachting is regularly open to the public, although it is not open on Sundays, Mondays or public holidays.

References

External links
Website of De Verwachting

Windmills in Friesland
Windmills completed in 1991
Smock mills in the Netherlands
Grinding mills in the Netherlands
Octagonal buildings in the Netherlands
1991 establishments in the Netherlands
20th-century architecture in the Netherlands